Quam may refer to:

 Quam Heights, a mostly snow-covered ridge of Antarctica
 Quam Lake, a lake in Minnesota

See also

 C-QUAM
 QAM